Pokémon: Johto League Champions is the fourth season of Pokémon and the fourth season of Pokémon: The Original Series, known in Japan as . It originally aired in Japan from August 3, 2000, to August 2, 2001, on TV Tokyo, and in the United States from August 18, 2001, to September 7, 2002, on The WB (Kids' WB).

The season follows the adventures of the ten-year-old Pokémon trainer Ash Ketchum and his electric mouse partner Pikachu as they collect Gym Badges in the fictional Johto region so they can compete in the Johto League competition.

The episodes were directed by Masamitsu Hidaka and produced by the animation studio OLM.



Episode list

Music
The Japanese opening songs are "OK!" by Rika Matsumoto for 34 episodes, and "Aim to be a Pokémon Master" (めざせポケモンマスター 2001, Mezase Pokémon Masutā 2001) by Whiteberry for 18 episodes. The ending songs are "Takeshi's Paradise" (タケシのパラダイス, Takeshi no Paradaisu) by Yūji Ueda for 5 episodes,  "Exciting Pokémon Relay" (ポケモンはらはらリレー, Pokémon Hara Hara Rirē) by Rikako Aikawa and Chorus for 10 episodes, "To My Best Friend" (ぼくのベストフレンドへ, Boku no Besuto Furendo e) by Hiromi Iwasaki for 19 episodes, "Face Forward Team Rocket!" (前向きロケット団!, Maemuki Roketto-Dan!) by Jessie, James, & Meowth with Wobbuffet for 18 episodes, and the English opening song is "Born to Be a Winner" by David Rolfe. Its short version serves as the end credit song.

Home media releases 
In the United States, Viz Video and Pioneer Entertainment (and later Ventura Distribution) released the series on DVD and VHS. The VHS versions continued on with the numbered volume sets consisting of three select episodes from the series, and were known as the "High-Voltage Collection". The DVD releases were known as the "Collector's Edition DVDs" and consisted of 7-10 episodes per DVD. These releases have long since gone out-of-print.

Viz Media released Pokémon: Johto League Champions – The Complete Collection on DVD in the United States on May 31, 2016.

References

External links 
 
  at TV Tokyo 
  at Pokémon JP official website 

2000 Japanese television seasons
2001 Japanese television seasons
Season04